The Downingtown Area School District is a school district based in Downingtown, in Chester County, Pennsylvania, in the United States.  The district operates ten elementary schools, three middle schools and three high schools.  As of 2018, the district educates approximately 12,000 students, making it the largest school district in Chester County.

Robert O' Donnell is the current superintendent of the Downingtown Area School District.

Geography
The district, located in central Chester County serves all of the following municipalities:

Downingtown Borough
East Brandywine Twp.
East Caln Twp.
Upper Uwchlan Twp.
Uwchlan Twp.
Wallace Twp.
West Bradford Twp.
West Pikeland Twp.

Events of significance

U.S. News & World Report -  Top High Schools in the US
US News has named all three DASD high schools, DHS East, DHS West and the Downingtown STEM Academy as three of the top high schools in the United States. DHS East and DHS West earned a silver award.  Downingtown STEM Academy received a bronze award.

Washington Post America's Most Challenging High Schools
DHS East, DHS West and the Downingtown STEM Academy have been named to the Washington Post's list of the most challenging high schools in America.

International Baccalaureate World School
The International Baccalaureate Organization has named the Downingtown STEM Academy an International Baccalaureate (IB) World School. The STEM Academy is the first IB World School in Chester County and will be the first high school in the nation to offer an IB program with STEM pathways.

Budget 2016–2017
The Downingtown Area School District Annual Budget https://www.dasd.org/cms/lib/PA01916467/Centricity/Domain/31/2016-2017%20Final%20Budget%20-%20PDE-2028.pdf

Schools within the Downingtown Area School District

Elementary schools 
Beaver Creek Elementary - Downingtown
Bradford Heights Elementary School - West Bradford Twp.
Brandywine Wallace Elementary School - East Brandywine Twp.
East Ward Elementary School - Downingtown
Lionville Elementary School - Uwchlan Twp.
Pickering Valley Elementary School - Upper Uwchlan Twp.
Shamona Creek Elementary School - Uwchlan Twp.
Springton Manor Elementary School - Wallace Twp.
Uwchlan Hills Elementary School - Uwchlan Twp.
West Bradford Elementary School - West Bradford Twp.

Middle schools
Downingtown Middle School - Caln Township - The school is physically in Caln Township but the township is not in the school district service area
Lionville Middle School - Uwchlan Twp.
Marsh Creek Sixth Grade Center - Uwchlan Twp.

High schools
Downingtown High School - Downingtown High School is split into two campuses: Downingtown East (Uwchlan Twp.) and Downingtown West (Downingtown). While still legally considered to be one school, East and West are generally regarded as being separate entities.
Downingtown STEM Academy (Science, Technology, Engineering, and Math) - A magnet high school opened Fall 2011.
Downingtown Cyber Academy - A new online educational school for high school students, opening in August 2012.

Famous graduates
Dave Days, musician from YouTube
Sara Shepard, author of Pretty Little Liars
Pat Devlin, NFL Quarterback
Kyle Lauletta, NFL Quarterback
Tyler Kroft, NFL Tight End

References

External links
 Downingtown Area School District Official Website
Downingtown STEM Academy
Downingtown High School West
Downingtown High School East
Lionville Middle School
Downingtown Middle School
Sixth Grade Center
West Bradford Elementary School
Uwchlan Hills Elementary School
Springton Manor Elementary School
Shamona Creek Elementary School
Pickering Valley Elementary School
Lionville Elementary School
East Ward Elementary School
Brandywine Wallace Elementary School
Bradford Heights Elementary School
Beaver Creek Elementary School
 Downingtown Area School District - PA Dept of Education profile
 Downingtown Area School District - Great Schools profile

 
School districts in Chester County, Pennsylvania